"Hello Friday" is a song by American rapper and singer Flo Rida featuring fellow American singer Jason Derulo. The song was released as a standalone single on February 26, 2016 in the United States. Remixes were released on May 6, 2016.

Track listings
Digital download
 "Hello Friday" – 3:21

Digital download – remixes
 "Hello Friday" (AVNU Remix) – 3:07
 "Hello Friday" (Owen Norton Remix) – 3:41
 "Hello Friday" (Khrebto Remix) – 4:11
 "Hello Friday" (Jawa Remix) – 3:56

Music video
The official music video directed by Alex Acosta was uploaded to YouTube on April 29, 2016. Natalie La Rose makes a cameo appearance.

Other media
The song was chosen as one of the theme songs for WWE's WrestleMania 32, along with "My House", also by Flo Rida.

Charts

References

External links

2016 singles
2016 songs
Atlantic Records singles
Flo Rida songs
Jason Derulo songs
Songs written by Flo Rida
Songs written by Breyan Isaac
Songs written by Thomas Troelsen
Songs written by Vinay Vyas
Songs written by Justin Davey
Songs written by Kane Beatz
Songs written by Jason Derulo